Galeodea plauta is a species of large sea snail, a marine gastropod mollusc in the family Cassidae, the helmet snails and bonnet snails.

Description

Distribution
This marine species is endemic to New Zealand.

References

External links

plauta
Gastropods described in 2008
Gastropods of New Zealand